Dorothea Hedwig of Brunswick-Wolfenbüttel (3 February 1587, Wolfenbüttel – 16 October 1609, Zerbst) was a princess of Brunswick-Wolfenbüttel by birth and by marriage Princess of Anhalt-Zerbst.

Life 
Dorothea Hedwig was the eldest child of the Duke Henry Julius of Brunswick-Wolfenbüttel (1564–1613) from his first marriage with Dorothea (1563–1587), daughter of the Elector August of Saxony (1526–1586). Her birth caused the death of her mother.

Dorothea Hedwig married on 29 December 1605 in Wolfenbüttel to Prince Rudolf von Anhalt-Zerbst (1576–1621). She died while giving birth to her fourth child, a still-born princess who was born an hour after the mother's death. The Princess was buried in the Bartholomai Church in Zerbst. Her motto was: The fear of the Lord is the beginning of wisdom.

Children 
From her marriage with Rudolp, Dorothea Hedwig had the following children:
 Daughter (1606–1606)
 Dorothea (1607–1634)
 married in 1623 Duke Augustus the Younger of Brunswick-Wolfenbüttel (1579–1666)
 Eleonor (1608–1680)
 married in 1632 Duke Frederick of Schleswig-Holstein-Sønderburg-Norburg (1581–1658)
 Stillborn daughter (1609–1609)

References 
 August B. Michaelis, Julius Wilhelm Hamberger: Einleitung zu einer volständigen Geschichte der Chur- und Fürstlichen Häuser in Teutschland, vol. 3, Meyer, 1785, p. 674

Footnotes 

Middle House of Brunswick
German princesses
1587 births
1609 deaths
People from Wolfenbüttel
House of Ascania
Deaths in childbirth
Royal reburials
Daughters of monarchs